Cecily Hill Barracks is a former military installation in Cirencester in Gloucestershire. The former keep for the barracks (known locally as The Castle, Cecily Hill) stands at the entrance to Cirencester Park.

History
The barracks were built in 1857 as the Royal North Gloucestershire Militia Armoury. In 1881, following the Childers Reforms, the barracks became the depot of the 4th Battalion of the Gloucestershire Regiment. During the Second World War they became the local base for the Home Guard. After the Army had no more use for the barracks, the Castle became a commercial building owned by the Bathurst Estate. Recently it was used by Cirencester College, who gave it the name 'The Castle'. Cirencester College moved out of the Castle in 2013 but the Castle is still used for commercial purposes. It is a Grade II* listed building.

References

Drill halls in England
Cirencester
Gloucestershire Militia
Grade II* listed buildings in Gloucestershire
1857 establishments in England